The following highways are numbered 85A:

United States
 Nebraska Spur 85A

See also
 A85 (disambiguation)
 List of highways numbered 85